Vangaži is a town in Ropaži Municipality in the Vidzeme region of Latvia.

History
The name Vangaži was first mentioned in the 17th century as the name of a local manor. The name itself is a combination of two words in the Livonian language - vang (field) and aži (place). Since the 17th century there was also a Lutheran church in Vangaži. Close to the modern town of Vangaži there were several manufactures which produced paper, glass and copper products.

The modern town started in the 1950s when the concrete factory was founded. In 1957 the village Oktobra ciemats was founded which in 1961 was renamed to Vangaži. In 1992 Vangaži was granted the status of a town.

Sports

From 1968 to 1991 Vangaži had a relatively strong football club - known at first as Celtnieks Vangaži, then renamed to Betons Vangaži. From 1989 to 1991 the club coached by Vladimirs Serbins played in the top Latvian football league. With the bankruptcy of the concrete factory the football club was disbanded. Latvia national football team footballer Viktors Morozs is the most notable footballer from Vangaži.

See also
List of cities in Latvia

References 

Towns in Latvia
Populated places established in 1991
1991 establishments in Latvia
Ropaži Municipality
Kreis Riga
Vidzeme